Nusach Ashkenaz is a style of Jewish liturgy conducted by Ashkenazi Jews. It is primarily a way to order and include prayers, and differs from Nusach Sefard (as used by the Hasidim) and Baladi-rite prayer, and still more from the Sephardic rite proper, in the placement and presence of certain prayers.

Subdivisions
Nusach Ashkenaz may be subdivided into the German or Western branch - Minhag Ashkenaz - used in Western and Central Europe, and the Polish/Lithuanian or Eastern branch - Minhag Polin - used in Eastern Europe, the United States and by some Israeli Ashkenazim, particularly those who identify as Litvaks ("Lithuanian"). 
In strictness, the term Minhag Ashkenaz applied only to the usages of German Jews south and west of the Elbe, most notably the community of Frankfurt. North-Eastern German communities such as Hamburg regarded themselves as following Minhag Polin, although their musical tradition and pronunciation of Hebrew, and some of the traditions about the prayers included, were more reminiscent of the western communities than of Poland proper.

There are a number of minor differences between the Israeli and American Ashkenazi practice in that the Israel follows some practices of the Vilna Gaon (see ) as well as some Sephardic practices. For example, the practice of most Ashkenazic communities in Israel to recite Ein Keloheinu during the week, as is the Sephardic practice. 

The ritual of the United Kingdom  - Minhag Anglia - is based on those of both Germany and Poland Hamburg; 
see Authorised Daily Prayer Book.
"Minhag Anglia" does also have wider connotations re the structure, and hashkafa, of English-Judaism more generally;
see United Synagogue, London Beth Din, Jews College.

History
Leopold Zunz claimed that the Ashkenazi rite is descended from the ancient Palestinian minhag, while the Sephardi rite is descended from Babylonia. Hakham Moses Gaster, in his introduction to the prayer book of the Spanish and Portuguese Jews, made exactly the opposite claim. To put the matter into perspective it must be emphasized that all Jewish liturgies in use in the world today are in substance Babylonian, with a small number of usages from the Land of Israel (Eretz Yisrael) surviving the process of standardization: in a list of differences preserved from the time of the Geonim, most of the usages recorded as from Eretz Yisrael are now obsolete.

Medieval Ashkenazi scholars stated that the Ashkenazi rite is largely derived from the Siddur Rab Amram and minor Talmudic tractate Massechet Soferim. This may be true, but in itself this does not support a claim of Babylonian origin as argued by Gaster: as pointed out by Louis Ginzberg the Siddur Rab Amram had itself been heavily edited to reflect the Old Spanish rite. The Ashkenazi rite also contains a quantity of early liturgical poetry from Eretz Yisrael that has been eliminated from other rites, and this fact was the main support for Zunz's theory.

The earliest recorded form of the Ashkenazi rite, in the broadest sense, may be found in an early medieval prayer book called Machzor Vitry. This however, like the Siddur Rashi of a century later, records the Old French rite rather than the Ashkenazi (German) rite proper, though the differences are small.  The Old French rite mostly died out after the expulsion of Jews from France in 1394, but certain usages survived on the High holidays only in the Appam community of Northwest Italy until shortly after WWII, and has since become extinct. Both the Old French and the Ashkenazi rites have a loose family resemblance to other ancient European rites such as the Italian, Romaniote and Provençal rites, and to a lesser extent to the Catalan and Old Spanish rites: the current Sephardic rite has since been standardized to conform with the rulings of the Geonim, thereby showing some degree of convergence with the Babylonian and North African rites.

The liturgical writings of the Romaniote Jews, especially the piyyutim (hymns), found their way through Italy to Ashkenaz and are preserved to this day in most Ashkenazi mahzorim.

Ashkenazi practices

 Tefillin are worn on Chol HaMoed (except on Shabbat). (The original custom was to wear tefillin for the entire Shacharis and Musaf services, for weekday New Moon and Chol HaMoed prayers; however, for the last several hundred years, almost all communities take off tefillin before Musaf on these day. Many today, particularly in Israel, do not wear tefillin on Chol HaMoed at all.)
 Separate blessings are said for the arm tefillin and the head tefillin.
 Barukh she'amar is recited before Hodu, as opposed to other rites which recite Hodu first.
 The second blessing before the Shema begins "Ahavah Rabbah" in the morning service and "Ahavas `Olam" in the evening.
 In the summer months the second blessing of the Amidah contains no reference to dew or rain (Sephardim insert the words morid ha-tal, "who makes the dew fall"). 
 The kedushah of shacharit begins "neqaddesh es shimcha", and the kedushah of mussaf (of shabbat and Yom Tov) begins "na'aritz'cha ve-naqdish'cha".
 There is one standard wording for the "Birkas Ha-Shanim", with only small variations between summer and winter.
 The Priestly Blessing (or Barechenu, which is a substitute for it) is said in minhah of fast days in general and not only on Yom Kippur.
 The last blessing of the Amidah is "Sim Shalom" in the morning service and "Shalom Rav" in the afternoon and evening services. (Congregations which follow German or Israeli Ashkenaz customs recite Sim Shalom at Shabbat Mincha as well, because of the afternoon Torah reading.)
 The Torah scroll is lifted and displayed to the congregation after the Torah reading rather than before.
 It is customary to stand for Kaddish.
 En Kelohenu concludes with a stanza about the making of incense.  It is recited only on Shabbat and Holidays. (Most communities in Israel recite it every day.)
 Adon Olam has only five stanzas.
 The morning service on Shabbos and Yom Tov contains Anim Zemirot - most communities recite it after Musaf, although some communities recite it after shacharis, right before taking out the Torah.
 It is a binding custom to avoid Kitniyos on Passover.
 Blessings are said over all four glasses of wine at the Passover Seder.
 Selichos do not begin until the Shabbos immediately before Rosh Hashanah if Rosh Hashanah falls on Thursday or Shabbos, or a week-and-a-half before if Rosh Hashanah falls on Monday or Tuesday.
 One set of Hanukkah lights is lit by each member of a household.
 The shammash is used to light the other Hanukkah lights.

See also
  Jewish prayer modes
  Minhag
  Minhag Morocco
  Nusach
  Nusach Sefard
  Nusach Ari
  Sephardic law and customs

References

Bibliography 
Davidson, Charles, Immunim Benusaḥ Hatefillah (3 vols): Ashbourne Publishing 1996
Ginzberg, Louis, Geonica: New York 1909
Goldschmidt, Meḥqare Tefillah u-Fiyyut (On Jewish Liturgy): Jerusalem 1978
Kalib, Sholom, The Musical Tradition of the Eastern European Synagogue (2 vols out of projected 5): Syracuse University Press 2001 (vol 1) and 2004 (vol 2)
Reif, Stefan, Judaism and Hebrew Prayer: Cambridge 1993. Hardback , ; Paperback , 
Reif, Stefan, Problems with Prayers: Berlin and New York 2006 , 
Wieder, Naphtali, The Formation of Jewish Liturgy: In the East and the West
Zimmels, Hirsch Jakob, Ashkenazim and Sephardim: their Relations, Differences, and Problems As Reflected in the Rabbinical Responsa: London 1958 (since reprinted).

External links
Machon Moreshes Ashkenaz Site devoted to the Western Ashkenazi (and specifically German) tradition
http://www.thebookpatch.com/BookStoreDetails.aspx?BookID=19123&ID=0da30d3e-df41-4b72-bdbe-ee301d7f0000 - a German Rite Nusaḥ Ashkenaz siddur compiled by Rabbi Rallis Wiesenthal with help from Machon Moreshes Ashkenaz and K'hal Adas Yeshurun-Jerusalem
K'hal Adas Yeshurun Cantorial music in the Western Ashkenazi tradition
What was considered Nusach Ashkenaz throughout the years
http://www.shulmusic.org Choral music in the Western Ashkenazi tradition
Sages of Ashkenaz database

Ashkenazi Jewish culture
Nusachs